Olav Nielsen (April 5, 1902 – April 25, 1944) was a Norwegian amateur boxer who competed in the 1928 Summer Olympics.

He was born and died in Oslo, and represented the sports club SK av 1909. He tied for ninth in the flyweight division in the boxing at the 1928 Summer Olympics.

In 1928 he was eliminated in the second round of the flyweight class after losing his fight to Baddie Lebanon.

1928 Olympic results
Below is the record of Olav Nielsen, a Norwegian flyweight boxer who competed at the 1928 Amsterdam Olympics:

 Round of 32: bye
 Round of 16: lost to Baddie Lebanon (South Africa) by decision

References

1902 births
1944 deaths
Sportspeople from Oslo
Flyweight boxers
Boxers at the 1928 Summer Olympics
Olympic boxers of Norway
Norwegian male boxers
20th-century Norwegian people

External links
profile